An indirect election or hierarchical voting is an election in which voters do not choose directly among candidates or parties for an office (direct voting system), but elect people who in turn choose candidates or parties. It is one of the oldest forms of elections and is used by many countries for heads of state (such as  presidents),  cabinets, heads of government (such as prime ministers), and/or upper houses. It is also used for some  supranational legislatures.

Positions that are indirectly elected may be chosen by a permanent body (such as a  parliament) or by a special body convened solely for that purpose (such as an electoral college).

In nearly all cases the body that controls the executive branch (such as a cabinet) is elected indirectly. This includes the cabinets of  most parliamentary systems; members of the public elect the parliamentarians, who then elect the cabinet. Upper houses, especially in federal republics, are often indirectly elected, either by the corresponding lower house or cabinet. Similarly, supranational legislatures can be indirectly elected by constituent countries' legislatures or executive governments. The indirect democracy is run by electoral college or president.

An election can be partially indirect, for example in the case of indirect single transferable voting, where only eliminated candidates select other candidates to transfer their vote share to.

Heads of state 

The President of the United States is elected indirectly. In a US presidential election, eligible members of the public vote for the members of an electoral college, who have previously pledged publicly to support a particular presidential candidate.  When the electoral college sits, soon after the election, it formally elects the candidate that has won a majority of the members of the electoral college. Because the electoral college seldom acts in an unexpected or unpredictable fashion, it is sometimes regarded as a ceremonial body, and US presidential elections are regarded as semi-direct.  Conversely, because the  members of the federal cabinet, including the vice president, are in practice nominated by the president, they are unquestionably elected indirectly. The electoral college is a controversial issue in US politics, especially following presidential elections when voting is polarised geographically in such a way that the electoral college elects a candidate who did not win an absolute majority of the popular vote. The National Popular Vote Interstate Compact, if enacted, would replace the Electoral College with a de facto plurality based direct election.

Similar to the United States, the President of the Republic of China was elected indirectly. Instead citizens of China elected members of the National Assembly which functioned similarly to the U.S. electoral college albeit where it can amend the Chinese constitution but its legislative functions were considered "reserve" powers that were meant to be exercised on an ad-hoc basis. After the loss of mainland China in the Chinese Civil War and subsequent constitutional amendments, the president is now directly elected by the citizens in the ROC free area; the National Assembly ceased to function in 2005.

The president of the European Commission is nominated by the European Council and confirmed or denied by the directly elected European Parliament (see Elections to the European Parliament).

Republics with parliamentary systems usually elect their head of state indirectly (e.g. Germany, Italy, Estonia, Latvia, Malta, Hungary, India, Israel, Bangladesh). In most of these, the head of state is merely a ceremonial figurehead with limited power. Some parliamentary republics, such as Ireland, Austria, Croatia, Bulgaria and the Czech Republic, directly elect their presidents.

Appointment 

Some countries have non-partisan heads of state who are appointed without any form of election, such as the President of Singapore.

Heads of government 

The head of government is called prime minister in Australia, Canada, New Zealand, Singapore and the United Kingdom

Under the Westminster system, named after and typified by the parliament of the United Kingdom, a prime minister (or first minister, premier, or chief minister) is the person that can command the largest coalition of supporters in parliament. In almost all cases, the prime minister is the leader of a political party (or coalition) that has a majority in the parliament, or the lower house (such as the House of Commons), or in the situation that no one party has a majority then the largest party or a coalition of smaller parties may attempt to form a minority government. The prime minister is thus indirectly elected as political parties elect their own leader through internal democratic process, while the general public choose from amongst the local candidates of the various political parties or independents.

In Spain, the Congress of Deputies votes on a motion of confidence of the king's nominee (customarily the party leader whose party controls the Congress) and the nominee's political manifesto, an example of an indirect election of the prime minister of Spain.

In Germany, the federal chancellor - the most powerful position on the federal level - is elected indirectly by the Bundestag, which in turn is elected by the population. The federal president proposes candidates for the chancellor's office. Although this has never happened, the Bundestag may in theory also choose to elect another person into office, which the president has to accept.

Upper houses 

German voters elect the Landtag members who elect the state government, which appoints members to the Bundesrat.

The Control Yuan of China, formerly a parliamentary chamber, was indirectly elected by its respective legislatures across the country: five from each province, two from each directly administered municipality, eight from Mongolia (by 1948 only the Inner Mongolian provinces were represented), eight from Tibet and eight from the overseas Chinese communities. As originally envisioned both the President and Vice President of the Control Yuan were to be elected by and from the members like the speaker of many other parliamentary bodies worldwide. The Control Yuan became a sole auditory body in Taiwan in 1993 after democratisation.

In France, election to the upper house of Parliament, the Sénat, is indirect. Electors (called "Grands électeurs") are locally elected representatives.

The Indian Rajya Sabha (upper house of parliament) is indirectly elected, largely by state legislatures; Manmohan Singh was a member of the Rajya Sabha but chosen by the majority party in the Lok Sabha (lower house of parliament) as the prime minister in 2004; as such, Singh as prime minister had never won a direct or popular election, and was introduced as a technocrat.

The United States Senate was indirectly elected by state legislatures until, after a number of attempts over the previous century, the 17th Amendment to the United States Constitution was ratified in 1913.

In some cases, most officials, including most members of legislatures – national and subnational – may be regarded as elected indirectly, because they are preselected by political parties. This kind of system is typified by the United States, at both the federal and state levels. That is primary elections and/or caucuses are responsible for choosing candidates, whose preselection is ratified by a party convention.

Some examples of indirectly elected supranational legislatures include: the parliamentary assemblies of the Council of Europe, OSCE, the WEU and NATO – in all of these cases, voters elect national parliamentarians, who in turn elect some of their own members to the assembly. The same applies to bodies formed by representatives chosen by a national government, e.g. the United Nations General Assembly – assuming the national governments in question are democratically elected in the first place.

Indirect single transferable voting is used to elect some members of the Senate in Pakistan.

See also
 List of democracy and elections-related topics
 Proxy voting
 Double direct election
 Liquid democracy

References

Elections by type